Reggie Lynch (born November 30, 1994) is an American basketball player for Juventus Utena of the Lithuanian Basketball League (LKL). He played college basketball for the Minnesota Golden Gophers. He transferred from Illinois State in 2015 and sat out the 2015–16 season. In 2016, he started at center for the Gophers and won Big Ten Defensive Player of the Year after setting the Gophers single-season record in blocks with 114.

High school career

College career

2015–16 season 
Lynch sat out the season due to NCAA transfer rules.

2016–17 season 
Lynch started 33 games for the Gophers. He won Big Ten Defensive Player of the year after recording 114 blocks which were second best in the entire nation. He had at least 5 blocks in 11 games during the season including a game where he posted 11 blocks at home against Penn State on February 25. Lynch was named the Big Ten Conference Defensive Player of the Year. While also helping to take the Gophers to the NCAA tournament and making the biggest season-to-season turnaround in college basketball history.

2017–18 season 
Lynch played the first 16 games of the season for the Golden Gophers before being expelled from the university after being found responsible for two separate acts of sexual misconduct. Lynch initially appealed the expulsion, but dropped the appeal in February 2018.

College statistics

Professional career
On July 20, 2018, Lynch signed with Estonian team Kalev/Cramo. He averaged 7.2 points 4.5 rebounds and 2.5 blocks. He spent the 2019–20 season for Serie A2 team Urania Basket Milano, averaging 11.3 points and 6.5 rebounds and 3.0 blocks per game. On August 16, 2020, Lynch signed a three-year deal with Lokomotiv Kuban of the VTB United League and the EuroCup.

On August 11, 2021, Lynch signed with Iraklis Thessaloniki of the Greek Basket League. On November 22, 2021, he parted ways with the Greek team, in order to sign with Italian club Napoli Basket. In 6 Greek Basket League games with Iraklis, he averaged 12 points, 5.3 rebounds and 3.5 blocks, playing around 27 minutes per contest. On March 29, 2022, Lynch signed with Baskets Oldenburg of the German Basketball Bundesliga until the end of the season.

On January 10, 2023, Lynch signed with Juventus Utena of the Lithuanian Basketball League (LKL).

References

External links
Minnesota Golden Gophers bio
RealGM profile

1994 births
Living people
Sportspeople from Edina, Minnesota
American expatriate basketball people in Estonia
American expatriate basketball people in Germany
American expatriate basketball people in Greece
American expatriate basketball people in Italy
American expatriate basketball people in Lithuania
American expatriate basketball people in Russia
American men's basketball players
Basketball players from Minnesota
BC Kalev/Cramo players
BC Juventus players
Centers (basketball)
Edina High School alumni
EWE Baskets Oldenburg players
Illinois State Redbirds men's basketball players
Iraklis Thessaloniki B.C. players
Minnesota Golden Gophers men's basketball players
Napoli Basket players
PBC Lokomotiv-Kuban players